This is a list of schools in Labuan, Malaysia. It is categorised according to the variants of schools in Malaysia, and is arranged alphabetically.

Primary education: Sekolah Kebangsaan (SK) 
 SK Tanjung Aru, Peti Surat 80994, 81097, 87019 Labuan, Wilayah Persekutuan
 SK Sungai Lada, Peti Surat 81097, 87020 Labuan, Wilayah Persekutuan
 SK Sungai Bedaun, Peti Surat 81097, 87020 Labuan, Wilayah Persekutuan
 SK Simpang K.A.N Sahri, Peti Surat 87000, 87000 Labuan, Wilayah Persekutuan
 SKK St Anne'S Convent, Peti Surat 82196, 87032 Labuan, Wilayah Persekutuan
 SKK Rancha-Rancha, Peti Surat 80355, 87013 Labuan, Wilayah Persekutuan
 SK Pekan II Wp Labuan, Peti Surat 81737, 87027 Labuan, Wilayah Persekutuan
 SK Pekan 1 Wp Labuan, Peti Surat 81104, 87021 Labuan, Wilayah Persekutuan
 SK Patau-Patau, Peti Surat 81416, 87024 Labuan, Wilayah Persekutuan
 SK Pantai, Peti Surat 81361, 87023 Labuan, Wilayah Persekutuan
 SK Membedai, Peti Surat 82074, 87030 Labuan, Wilayah Persekutuan
 SK Lubok Temiang, Peti Surat 80787, 87017 Labuan, Wilayah Persekutuan
 SK Layang-Layangan, Peti Surat 82265, 87032 Labuan, Wilayah Persekutuan
 SK Kerupang, Peti Surat 80277, 87013 Labuan, Wilayah Persekutuan
 SK Bukit Kalam, Peti Surat 81097, 87020 Labuan, Wilayah Persekutuan
 SK Bebuloh, Peti Surat 81332, 87023 Labuan, Wilayah Persekutuan
 SJK (C) Chung Hwa, Peti Surat 81235, 87008 Labuan, Wilayah Persekutuan
 SJK (C) Chi Wen, P.O.Box 136, 87008 Labuan, Wilayah Persekutuan

Secondary education: Sekolah Menengah Kebangsaan (SMK) 

 SM Sains Labuan (SMSL), Peti Surat 82206, 87032 Labuan, Wilayah Persekutuan
 SMA Majlis Agama Islam Wilayah Persekutuan Labuan (SMA MAIWPL), Peti Surat 81043,87021 Wilayah Persekutuan Labuan

College 
 Kolej Matrikulasi Labuan, Jalan OKK Daud Merinding, P.O Box 81735, 87027 Labuan, Wilayah Persekutuan
 Kolej Vokasional Labuan, Peti Surat 80276, 87013 Labuan, Wilayah Persekutuan

Others 
 SM Sains Labuan, Peti Surat 82206, 87032 Labuan, Wilayah Persekutuan
 Labuan International School
 Sekolah Menengah Agama MAIWP

Labuan